Robert Donner (April 27, 1931 – June 8, 2006) was an American television and film actor.

Early life and career
 
Donner was born in New York City on April 27, 1931. He was raised in New Jersey, Michigan and Texas. He spent four years in the United States Navy and was stationed in California. After he completed his military service, he settled in the Los Angeles area.

Career
Donner's first role was an uncredited part in the 1959 John Wayne Western Rio Bravo; he also appeared in the sequels (which formed a loose trilogy), El Dorado and Rio Lobo. He also appeared in Chisum, The Undefeated, and The Man Who Shot Liberty Valance. His best-known television roles were as the ex-convict/informant T.J. on Adam-12, Yancy Tucker on The Waltons and as Exidor on Mork & Mindy.

Personal life
Donner married producer/writer Jill Sherman in 1982. He died of a heart attack at the age of 75.

Selected filmography

Films

1959: Rio Bravo as (uncredited)
1963: The Nutty Professor as College Student (uncredited)
1964: The Disorderly Orderly as Interne (uncredited)
1965: Red Line 7000 as Leroy Agers (uncredited)
1966: Agent for H.A.R.M. as Morgue Attendant
1967: Catalina Caper as Fingers O'Toole
1967: El Dorado as Milt
1967: The Spirit Is Willing as Ebenezer Twitchell
1967: Cool Hand Luke as Boss Shorty
1968: The Private Navy of Sgt. O'Farrell as Marine Pvt. Ogg
1968: Skidoo as Another Switchboard Operator
1969: The Undefeated as Judd Mailer
1970: Mrs. Pollifax-Spy as Larrabee
1970: Zig Zag as Sgt. Mason Weber
1970: Chisum as Bradley Morton
1970: Rio Lobo as Whitey Carter
1971: Vanishing Point as Deputy Collins
1971: One More Train to Rob as Sheriff Adams
1971: Fools' Parade as Willis Hubbard
1971: Something Big as Angel Moon
1972: Pickup on 101 as Jesse (1st Farmer)
1973: High Plains Drifter as Preacher
1973: The Man Who Loved Cat Dancing as Dub
1973: Santee as J.C.
1975: Bite the Bullet as Reporter
1975: The Boy Who Talked to Badgers as Burton
1975: Take a Hard Ride as Skave 
1976: The Last Hard Men as Lee Roy
1977: Damnation Alley as Man / Guard
1979: Five Days from Home as Karl Baldwin
1981: Under the Rainbow as The Assassin
1983: Hysterical as Ralph
1986: Allan Quatermain and the Lost City of Gold as Swarma
1998: Leslie Nielsen's Stupid Little Golf Video as Himself, Leslie Nielsen's Trusted Caddie
2006: Hoot as Kalo

Television

1961–67: Rawhide – 4 episodes
1965: Combat! – episode: "Odyssey" as American GI
1965: I Spy – episode: "Dragon's Teeth" as Dr. Bustard
1966/67: Daniel Boone – episodes: "The Trap", "Take the Southbound Stage"
1967: Laredo – episode: "A Question of Guilt" as Patrick Clancy
1967: Garrison's Gorillas – episodes: "The Great Crime Wave", "The Great Theft
1968: I Spy – episode: "Home to Judgment" as Mailman
1968: Death Valley Days – episode: "Ten Day Millionaires" as Tom
1968: The Guns of Will Sonnett – episodes: "Guilt", "Look for the Hound Dog"
1968: Gunsmoke – episode: "A Noose for Dobie Price" as Gil Boylan
1968: Good Morning World – First Down and 200 Miles to Go" as Justice of the Peace
1968: The Guns of Will Sonnett – episode:  as Lou Parkin
1968: The Virginian – episode: "Ride to Misadventure" as Matt Dooley
1968–73: Adam-12 – 6 episodes as T.J.
1969: Bonanza – episode: "Meena" as Owen
1969: The Big Valley – episode: "Town of No Exit" as Pete Haunch 
1969: Ironside – episode: "A Bullet for Mark" as Gas Station Owner
1970: The High Chaparral – episode: "A Matter of Vengeance" as Wilby
1970: Bonanza – episode: "The Horse Traders" as Owen Potter
1970: The High Chaparral – episode: "The Reluctant Deputy" as Sam Pelletier
1971: Alias Smith and Jones – episode: "Never Trust an Honest Man" as Preacher
1971: Mod Squad – episodes: "Feet of Clay", "The Hot, Hot Car"
1971: Alias Smith and Jones – episode: "The Bounty Hunter" as Nate
1971: The Bold Ones: The Senator – episode: "George Washington Told a Lie" as Matlock
1973: Columbo – episode: "Any Old Port in a Storm" as The Drunk
1973: McMillan & Wife – episode: "Two Dollars on Trouble to Win" as Price
1973: Cannon – episode: "The Seventh Grave" as Chief
1973: Kung Fu – episode: "The Tide" as Amos Houlton
1973: Griff – episode: "Isolate and Destroy" as Roscoe
1973: Mannix – episode: "Climb a Deadly Mountain" as Rizo
1974/75: The Six Million Dollar Man – episodes: "Stranger in Broken Fork", "The White Lightning War"
1974: McCloud – episode: "The Concrete Jungle Caper" as Val
1975: S.W.A.T. – episode: "Time Bomb" as Sarge
1975: Gunsmoke – episode: "The Hiders" as Belnap
1975: Cannon – episode: "Perfect Fit for a Frame" as Sheriff
1975: Walt Disney's Wonderful World of Color – episode: "The Boy Who Talked to Badgers: Parts 1 & 2" as Burton
1976: Sara – episode: "When Gentlemen Agree" as Harrington
1976: Captains and the Kings – miniseries – episode: "Chapter VII" as Wounded Texan
1976: Territorial Men – movie as Harrington as
1976: Young Pioneers' Christmas – movie as Mr. Peters 
1976: Charlie's Angels – episode: "To Kill an Angel" as Korbin / Frank Evans 
1976: The Quest – episode: "Incident at Drucker's Tavern" as Mr. Drucker
1976: City of Angels – episode: "The Bloodshot Eye" 
1977: The Feather and Father Gang – episode: "Flight to Mexico"
1972–78: The Waltons – 19 episodes as Yancy Tucker
1978–82: Mork & Mindy – 22 episodes as Exidor
1978: How the West Was Won – episode: "Brothers" as Mr. Evans 
1978: Walt Disney's Wonderful World of Color – episode: "Trail of Danger: Parts 1 & 2" as The Sheep Boss
1979: The MacKenzies of Paradise Cove – episode: "Last of the Red Hot Luaus" as Insbrocker
1979: B.J. and the Bear – episode: "Lobo" 
1980/81: The Incredible Hulk – episodes: "Sideshow", "The Phenom"
1981: Match Game – episode: "261" as himself
1983: Voyagers! – episode: "Buffalo Bill and Annie Play the Palace" as Buffalo Bill Cody
1983: Little House on the Prairie – episode: "The Older Brothers" as Bart Younger
1983: The Mississippi – episode: "Crisis of Identity" as Bates
1984: The A-Team – episode: "Breakout!" as Sheriff J.C. Bickford
1984: Simon & Simon – episode: "A Little Wine with Murder?" as Cody Dexter
1984: Oh Madeline – episode: "Ladies' Night Out" as Gambler
1984: Blue Thunder – episode: "Revenge in the Sky" as Neil Gerrard
1986/88: Matlock – episodes: "The Cop", "The Fisherman"
1986: Murder, She Wrote – episode: "If a Body Meet a Body" as Silas Pike
1987/89: MacGyver – episodes: "Soft Touch", "Cleo Rocks"
1987: Fame – episode: "That Was the Weekend That Was" as Exalted Muskrat
1987–88: Falcon Crest – 5 episodes as Tucker Fixx
1988: Webster – episode: "The Cuckoo's Nest" as Tiger 
1989: Good Morning, Miss Bliss – episode: "The Mentor" as James Lyman
1990: MacGyver – episode: "Serenity, and MacGyver's Women" as Milt Bozer
1991/94: Columbo – episodes: "Caution: Murder Can Be Hazardous to Your Health", "Undercover" 
1991: Murder, She Wrote – episode: "From the Horse's Mouth" as Sheriff Tyrone McKenna
1992: In the Heat of the Night – episode: "Family Reunion" as Roy Paxton
1995: Legend – 5 episodes as Mayor Chamberlain Brown
1998: Pacific Blue – episode: "Heat of the Moment" as Luther
1999/2000 Early Edition - 2 episodes "Time" and "Fate" as Lucius Snow

References

External links

 
 
 Profile, movies.nytimes.com

1931 births
2006 deaths
American male film actors
American male television actors
Male actors from New York City
20th-century American male actors